Nacella mytilina is a species of sea snail, a true limpet, a marine gastropod mollusk in the family Nacellidae, one of the families of true limpets.

Description

Distribution

References

 Gonzalez-Wevar C.A., T. Nakano, J.I. Canete & E. Poulin (2011) Concerted genetic, morphological and ecological diversification in Nacella limpets in the Magellanic Province. Molecular Ecology 20: 1936–1951

External links

Nacellidae
Gastropods described in 1779